Eogenes is a Palearctic genus of grass skippers in the family Hesperiidae.

Species
The following species are recognised in the genus Eogenes: 
Eogenes alcides
Eogenes lesliei (Evans, 1910) the Pakistani Skipper (Chitral)

References
Natural History Museum Lepidoptera genus database

Hesperiinae
Hesperiidae genera